Lawrence Cager (born August 20, 1997) is an American football tight end for the New York Giants of the National Football League (NFL). He played college football at Miami (FL) and Georgia.

Early life and high school
Cager attended Calvert Hall College High School in Towson, Maryland, where he played high school football. He was ranked as a four-star prospect by Rivals.com.

College career
Cager had 45 receptions for 681 yards and 10 receiving touchdowns in his three seasons at Miami (FL) until transferring to Georgia for his senior season. Cager had 33 receptions for 476 yards and four receiving touchdowns in his lone season at Georgia.

Collegiate statistics

Professional career

New York Jets
In May 2020, Cager signed with the New York Jets as an undrafted free agent after the 2020 NFL Draft. He was waived on September 5, 2020, and signed to the practice squad the next day. He was elevated to the active roster on September 26 for the team's week 3 game against the Indianapolis Colts, and reverted to the practice squad after the game on September 28. He made his NFL debut in the game, recording two receptions for 35 yards. He was elevated again on October 1 for the week 4 game against the Denver Broncos, and reverted to the practice squad again the next day. He suffered a hamstring injury in the game, and was placed on the practice squad/injured list on October 7. He was activated back to the practice squad on October 28. He was signed to the active roster on December 12, 2020.

On August 31, 2021, Cager was waived by the Jets.

Cleveland Browns
On October 4, 2021, Cager signed with the Cleveland Browns practice squad. The Browns elevated Cager to their active roster on November 20, 2021. He was promoted to the active roster on December 16. He was waived on December 24. Cager was re-signed to the Browns' practice squad on December 28, 2021.

New York Jets (second stint)
On January 12, 2022, Cager signed a reserve/future contract with the New York Jets and changed his position to tight end. He was waived on October 15, 2022.

New York Giants
On October 18, 2022, the New York Giants signed Cager to their practice squad. Cager was elevated from the practice squad for Week 8 and Week 10 games against the Seattle Seahawks and Houston Texans. In Week 10 against the Houston Texans Cager recorded his first career touchdown in the 24-16 win. On November 19, 2022, he was elevated from the practice squad for the third time this season for Week 11 game against the Detroit Lions. On November 22, 2022, Cager was promoted to the active roster.

References

External links 
New York Jets bio
Georgia Bulldogs bio

1997 births
Living people
21st-century African-American sportspeople
African-American players of American football
American football wide receivers
Cleveland Browns players
Georgia Bulldogs football players
Miami Hurricanes football players
New York Jets players
New York Giants players
Players of American football from Baltimore